The Toledo Blue Stockings formed as a minor league baseball team in Toledo, Ohio, in 1883. They won the Northwestern League championship in 1883. Their home ballpark was League Park. The following year, they joined the major league American Association. That year, they finished 8th with a 46–58 record. The team returned to the minors the next year and disbanded after the 1885 season. 

The team was the only major league team with black players (brothers Moses Fleetwood Walker and Weldy Walker) prior to Jackie Robinson's appearance with the Brooklyn Dodgers in 1947. This was before baseball's color barrier had been firmly established in 1887.

Notable players
Tony Mullane
Hank O'Day
Moses Fleetwood Walker
Weldy Walker

See also
Toledo Blue Stockings all-time roster
1884 Toledo Blue Stockings season

External links

American Association (1882–1891) baseball teams
Sports teams in Toledo, Ohio
Defunct baseball teams in Ohio
Northwestern League teams
Baseball teams established in 1883
Baseball teams disestablished in 1885